Poisoning is the action of poison.

Poisoning may also refer to:
 Biological toxicity
 Toxin
 Envenomation, when an animal injects its venom through a bite or sting
 Secondary poisoning
 Radiation poisoning, a biology concept
 Catalyst poisoning, a chemistry concept
 Neutron poison, a nuclear physics concept
 Route poisoning, a computer network concept